Portugal has a system of orders, decorations, and medals as a means of honouring individuals for personal bravery, achievement, or service to Portugal.

The honorific orders are currently regulated by Law 5/2011. The decorations are given by the President of the Portuguese Republic, currently Marcelo Rebelo de Sousa. In addition the Portuguese government, through the Portuguese Red Cross legal framework, regulates and recognizes the Portuguese Red Cross Decorations.

Ancient military orders

Order of the Tower and Sword
()

Military Order of Christ

The Military Order of Christ is one of the ancient military orders. It was created by request of King D. Dinis to the pope, upon the extinction of the Order of the Temple. The Templars had been granted important jurisdictions over the Portuguese territory, as well as being of strategic importance in its protection, in the end of the Christian Reconquest of the Iberian Peninsula. So, when the Order of the Temple was extinguished, King Dinis requested, and was granted, that all the possessions of this order in Portugal be attributed to a new order, to be created: the order of Christ. In essence, the Templars in Portugal simply changed name.

The headquarters of the Order were established in Tomar. The Order had a major role in the Portuguese discoveries. In the course of the subsequent centuries, the King of Portugal became the grand-master of this and all of the military orders, which acquired a simple honorific role.

The Order of Christ is now conferred by relevant services to the country in the exercise of functions related to the government or public administration (e.g., courts, diplomacy, armed forces)

Military Order of Aviz
()

Military Order of St. James of the Sword
()

National orders

Order of Prince Henry
()

Order of Liberty
()

Order of Camões
()

Orders of civil merit

Order of Merit
()

Order of Public Instruction
()

Orders of Entrepreneurial Merit
()

 Category of Agricultural Merit
 Category of Commercial Merit
 Category of Industrial Merit

Portuguese Red Cross Decorations

Extinct orders

Order of the Colonial Empire
()

Royal Dynastic Orders
During Portugal's time as a monarchy, several orders were created by the sovereign as honorific orders and not military orders. As such, when Portugal became a republic, these orders remained with the House of Braganza as dynastic orders and were not nationalized by the Portuguese Republic. Their Grand-Masters are Duarte Pio, Duke of Braganza and Isabel, Duchess of Braganza.

Order of the Immaculate Conception of Vila Viçosa
()

Order of Saint Michael of the Wing
()

Order of Saint Isabel
()

Order of Merit of the Portuguese Royal House
()

Decorations
 Military Valor Medal, established on 2 October 1863 to reward "heroic deeds of extraordinary selflessness and bravery or great moral courage and exceptional ability to make decisions, whether in war or in time of peace, but always in circumstances where there is proven or suspected danger to life". It comprises three grades - Gold, Silver and Copper. Award of the Medal in Gold confers entitlement to wear a fourragère.
 War Cross, established on 30 November 1916 to reward acts of bravery and deeds performed in wartime. It could be awarded to military personnel and civilians as well as to foreign military personnel and civilians. It may also be awarded to military units and to towns 'that have collectively practiced feats of arms of exceptional value.' It is awarded in four classes. Award of the Gold (1st Class) confers entitlement to wear a fourragère.
 Distinguished Service Medal, established on 2 October 1863 as the Good Services Medal to recognise extraordinary military service or outstanding acts. Originally it consisted of two classes - gold and silver - and was awarded only to military officers. On 11 September 1919, the regulations were modified to add a third class (copper) in order to recognise non-commissioned officers and soldiers. On 28 May 1946, the name of the medal was changed to the Distinghished Service Medal.
 Military Merit Medal, established on 28 May 1946 to reward military personnel for meritorious service as demonstrated by a display of exceptional qualities, military virtues, a spirit of sacrifice and selflessness, moral courage, bravery and loyalty that are deserving of public recognition. The medal was established in five classes - Grand Cross (for ministers and secretaries of military departments and generals), 1st Class (for Colonel and above with at least 20 years service), 2nd Class (for Captain-Lieutenant and above with at least 10 years of service), 3rd Class (for junior officers holding the rank of Captain or below and with at least 2 years service), and 4th class (non-commissioned officers and soldiers with at least 2 years service).
 National Defense Medal
 St George's Cross
 Navy Cross
 D. Afonso Henriques Medal
 Army Merit Medal
 Aeronautical Merit Medal
 Exemplary Behaviour Medal, established on 2 October 1863 to recognise meritorious long service with exemplary behaviour. It was established in three grades - gold (30 years exemplary service), silver (15 years exemplary service) and copper (non-commissioned officers and soldiers with 6 years of exemplary service).

Medals
 Campaign Service Medal, established on 30 November 1916 to recognise wartime service. The medal is issued with a clasp for each military campaign the recipient has served in. Eligibility for the medal was backdated to the Mozambique campaign of 1897–98.
 Special Service Commissions Medal, established on 28 May 1946 to recognise service during 'non-warlike' operations.
 Expeditionary Medal
 Distinguished Achievement on Operations Medal, established on 28 May 1946 to replace an earlier insignia established on 2 December 1919. The medal is awarded to recognise distinguished command and leadership on military operations. It consists of one class, however it is awarded with a gold star for the ribbon when awarded to generals, a silver star when awarded to officers and a copper star when awarded to non-commissioned officers and soldiers.
 Wounded on Operations Medal, established on 28 May 1946 to replace an earlier badge established on 5 October 1918. The medal is awarded to recognise military personnel who have been permanently wounded in war or war-like, such wounds being characterised by amputation, loss of an organ or permanent functional impairment.
 Recognition Medal, established on 27 December 2002 to recognise military personnel who have been captured during war or other military missions such including peacekeeping and humanitarian missions.
 Victory Medal
 500th Anniversary of the Death of the Infante Commemorative Medal, established in 1960.
 Red Cross Medal

Orders of Precedence

Current Order of Precedence
(Established by Decree-Law No 316/2002 of 27 December 2002)
 Order of the Tower and Sword
 Military Valor Medal
 War Cross
 Military Order of Christ
 Military Order of Aviz
 Distinguished Service Medal
 Military Merit Medal
 Military Order of St James of the Sword
 Order of Infante D. Henrique
 Order of Liberty
 Distinguished services or relevant overseas services
 Exemplary Behaviour Medal
 Distinguished Achievement on Operations Medal
 Wounded in Battle Medal
 Recognition Medal
 Campaign Service Medal
 Special Service Commissions Commemorative Medal
 Other National Orders
 Other National Medals
 Foreign Orders, Decorations and Medals

Notes
 Distinguished services or relevant overseas services: the National Defense Medal, the St George's Cross, Navy Cross, D. Afonso Henriques Medal, Army Merit Medal, and Aeronautical Merit Medal.
 Other National Orders: Order of Merit, Order of Public Instruction, Order of Agricultural Merit, Order of Commercial Merit, Order of Industrial Merit
 Other National Medals: 500th Anniversary of the Death of the Infante Commemorative Medal

Former Order of Precedence
(As prior to the 1974 Carnation Revolution)
 Order of the Tower and Sword
 Military Valor Medal
 War Cross
 Distinguished Service Medal
 Military Merit Medal
 Military Order of Aviz
 Military Order of Christ
 Military Order of St James of the Sword
 Order of the Colonial Empire (no longer awarded)
 Order of Infante D. Henrique
 Distinguished Services or Relevant Overseas Services
 Exemplary Behaviour Medal
 Distinguished Achievement on Operations Medal
 Wounded in Battle Medal
 Campaign Service Medal
 Victory Medal
 Special Service Commissions Commemorative Medal
 Other National Orders
 Other National Medals
 Foreign Orders, Decorations and Medals

Notes
 Other National Orders: Order of Merit, Order of Public Instruction, Order of Agricultural, Commercial or Industrial Merit
 Other National Medals: 500th Anniversary of the Death of the Infante Commemorative Medal

See also
 List of honours of Portugal awarded to heads of state and royalty

References

External links

Official site (PT)
Lei n.º 5/2011, Lei das Ordens Honoríficas Portuguesas
Site on the Portuguese orders and their history (in Portuguese)